Fairview Terraces is a shopping mall in Quezon City, the Philippines, owned by the Ayala Malls group.

Location
Fairview Terraces is located at Quirino Highway cor. Maligaya Drive, Pasong Putik Proper, Novaliches, Quezon City. Strategically located in Fairview area, the mall is across the interserction of Regalado and Quirino Highways, across the latter from SM City Fairview, a block away from Robinsons Novaliches and beside The Redwoods condominium complex.

In popular culture
 The mall was featured in the 2014 anti-camcording campaign starred by Derek Ramsay.
 The mall was featured in ABS-CBN's primetime show FPJ's: Ang Probinsyano, where an explosion occurred in one of the cinemas.
 The mall was featured in GMA Network's Ika-6 na Utos.
 The mall was featured in the 2017 film Woke Up Like This.
 The mall was featured as two fictional malls (edited as Ricarte Mall and Capital Mall), in ABS-CBN's The General's Daughter, where a bomb was planted in any of the said malls.
 The mall was featured in GMA Network's InstaDad.
 The mall was featured in GMA Network's Poor Señorita.

See also
Ayala Malls
SM City Fairview
Robinsons Novaliches
TriNoma

References

External links
Fairview Terraces Official website

Shopping malls in Quezon City
Shopping malls established in 2014
Ayala Malls